The 2016 Presbyterian Blue Hose football team represented Presbyterian College in the 2016 NCAA Division I FCS football season. They were led by eighth-year head coach Harold Nichols and played their home games at Bailey Memorial Stadium. They were a member of the Big South Conference. They finished the season 2–9, 1–4 in Big South play to finish in fifth place.

On December 20, head coach Harold Nichols resigned. He finished at Presbyterian with an eight year record of 21–67.

Schedule

Source: Schedule

Game summaries

at Central Michigan

at Chattanooga

at Campbell

Florida Tech

at Gardner–Webb

Monmouth

at Charleston Southern

Coastal Carolina

Liberty

at Kennesaw State

at South Alabama

References

Presbyterian
Presbyterian Blue Hose football seasons
Presbyterian Blue Hose football